Afghanistan has an embassy in Madrid. In August 2021, Spain closed its embassy in Kabul.

Military operations
 The Spanish military operations in Afghanistan were developed with the objective of clearing the insurgency in the provinces of Herat and Badghis (Together many times with Italian forces) in Afghanistan and leave the province ready for Afghans to take care of it after the withdrawal of Spanish troops in 2014 in addition to rebuild those provinces which were in charge.

References 

 
Spain
Afghanistan